Steve Thomas (born March 14, 1981) is an American basketball player who graduated from Middle Tennessee State. He was undrafted in the 2005 NBA Draft. He last played for the GlobalPort Batang Pier in the Philippine Basketball Association. He plays the power forward position.

Thomas played for the Atlanta Krunk and East Kentucky Miners of the Continental Basketball Association (CBA) during the 2007–08 season. He was named to the All-CBA Second Team and All-Defensive Team.

References

Living people
1981 births
Middle Tennessee Blue Raiders men's basketball players
Philippine Basketball Association imports
Power forwards (basketball)
NorthPort Batang Pier players
American expatriate basketball people in the Philippines
Barako Bull Energy players
Correcaminos UAT Victoria players
ASEAN Basketball League players
American men's basketball players
American expatriate basketball people in Mexico
Centers (basketball)
American expatriate basketball people in Poland
American expatriate basketball people in South Korea
Suwon KT Sonicboom players
American expatriate basketball people in Indonesia
American expatriate basketball people in Thailand
American expatriate basketball people in Vietnam
American expatriate basketball people in Macau